Harvester is a British casual dining restaurant chain with over 230 outlets (as of December 2015) in the United Kingdom.

The first location was The George Inn, opening in 1983 in Morden, Greater London. The chain was seen before as a rival to Whitbread's Beefeater restaurants.

It is owned by Mitchells & Butlers which owns many other UK food and drink chains.

Bass 
On 21 July 1995, Bass bought the seventy eight restaurants of Harvester for £165 million. Whitbread had offered £150 million for the chain. Most Harvesters were in the South East, and Bass had plans to rebrand other restaurants (such as the former Innkeeper's Fayre) elsewhere in England as Harvesters. When Bass divested its brewing division in 2000, the chain was looked after by the renamed company, Six Continents, until 2003.

Mitchells & Butlers 
On 15 April 2003, the chain Six Continents was taken over by the renamed company, Mitchells & Butlers, and had 127 outlets. By 2012, there were over two hundred hotels across the United Kingdom.

The brand grew far larger after the purchase of a large number of Brewers Fayres and Beefeaters from Whitbread.

Return to television and radio advertising 
For the first time in ten years, Harvester Restaurants spent nearly £20,000 on advertising on both television in the United Kingdom, and radio stations in July 2010. The advertising campaign was part of a general shift within Mitchells & Butlers, to focus on businesses that were food led. As part of the marketing campaign, they also run "free ice cream vouchers when you order main meal" campaigns periodically.

Sustainability
In November 2015, the chain was the worst out of seven restaurants surveyed that failed to meet a basic level of sustainability in its seafood.

See also
 Brewers Fayre, owned by Whitbread
 Beefeater, owned by Whitbread
 Toby Carvery, also owned by M & B
 List of restaurant chains

References

External links

 Official website
 Harvester YouTube channel

Mitchells & Butlers
Restaurant groups in the United Kingdom
British companies established in 1983
Restaurants established in 1983
Restaurants in Birmingham, West Midlands